Kim Hong Kyu(Korean:김홍규)is a South Korean paralympic archer. He won the gold medal at the Men's team recurve event at the 2008 Summer Paralympics in Beijing.

References

South Korean male archers
Living people
Paralympic silver medalists for South Korea
Paralympic archers of South Korea
Archers at the 2008 Summer Paralympics
Paralympic gold medalists for South Korea
Year of birth missing (living people)
Medalists at the 2008 Summer Paralympics
Paralympic medalists in archery
20th-century South Korean people
21st-century South Korean people